Roy Vincent Baker (born 8 June 1954) is an English former professional footballer who played as a striker.

Career
Born in Bradford in 1954, Baker played for Eccleshill United, Bradford City, Guiseley, Thackley, Bradford (Park Avenue), Bridlington Town and Farsley Celtic. He played 46 games in the Football League for Bradford City, scoring 11 times.

Sources

References

1954 births
Living people
English footballers
Eccleshill United F.C. players
Bradford City A.F.C. players
Guiseley A.F.C. players
Thackley F.C. players
Bradford (Park Avenue) A.F.C. players
Bridlington Town A.F.C. players
Farsley Celtic F.C. players
English Football League players
Footballers from Bradford
Association football forwards